Ferro-ferri-hornblende is an amphibole-supergroup mineral with the formula ☐Ca2(Fe2+4Fe3+)(Si7Al)O22(OH)2. It contains essential vacancy (☐). It was discovered in the Traversella mine, Canavese, Torino, Piedmont, Italy.

References

Amphibole group
Silicate minerals
Calcium minerals
Aluminium minerals
Iron(II,III) minerals
Monoclinic minerals
Minerals in space group 12